The red-billed gull (Chroicocephalus novaehollandiae scopulinus), also known as tarāpunga and once also known as the mackerel gull, is a native of New Zealand, being found throughout the country and on outlying islands including the Chatham Islands and subantarctic islands. It was formerly considered a separate species but is now usually treated as a subspecies of the silver gull (Chroicocephalus novaehollandiae).

The Māori name of this species is tarāpunga or akiaki. Its vernacular name is sometimes also used for the dolphin gull, a somewhat similar-looking but unrelated species that is found in coastal southern Chile, Argentina and the Falkland Islands.  As is the case with many gulls, the red-billed gull has traditionally been placed in the genus Larus.

A national survey of breeding red-billed gulls carried out in 2014–2016 recorded 27,831 pairs nesting in New Zealand. The authors of the study based on the survey and published in 2018 said that the accuracy of previous estimates was questionable, but that the species nevertheless appeared to have declined nationally since the mid-1960s. The study also discussed the possible reasons for the decline and made a proposal for future monitoring.

Description
The red-billed gull is a fairly small gull with an all-red bill, red eye ring, red legs and feet, pale grey wings with black wingtips. The rest of the body and tail are white. There is virtually no visual difference between the male and female birds. Juvenile gulls have a dark brown bill with only hints of red, making them difficult to distinguish from the black-billed gull. The legs are also brown and there are brown spots on the grey wings.

Distribution
It is the smallest gull commonly seen in New Zealand. The population is estimated at 500,000. It was formerly considered a distinctive species, but looks similar to the silver gull found in Australia, and is now considered to be a subspecies.

Behaviour

Behaviourally, the red-billed gull is a typical gull. It is an aggressive scavenger and kleptoparasite. Since European settlement its numbers have increased, especially around coastal towns and cities where it can scavenge from urban waste. It normally feeds on small fish, shell fish and worms (from pastures), and sometimes berries, lizards and insects.

Life cycle
They nest from October to December in colonies on the coast, either on islands or rocky headlands, cliffs and beaches. The birds form pair bonds which endure across seasons, but there is a certain amount of extra-pair copulation. Courtship feeding is an important part of the preparation for mating. Nests are well formed and may be constructed of seaweed, grasses, leaves and ice plants. Generally two to three eggs are laid, their colour ranges from brown to grey with light and dark brown spots all over. The bird generally lives up to 12 years, although individuals have also been found living up to 30 years.

Gallery

Notes

References

Mills, J. A. (1994).  Extra-pair copulations in the Red-Billed Gull: Females with high-quality, attentive males resist.  Behaviour, 128, 41–64.
 Pons J.M., Hassanin, A., and Crochet P.A.(2005). Phylogenetic relationships within the Laridae (Charadriiformes: Aves) inferred from mitochondrial markers. Molecular Phylogenetics and Evolution 37(3):686-699
Tasker, C. R., & Mills, J. A. (1981). A functional analysis of courtship feeding in the Red-billed Gull, Larus Novaehollandiae scopulinus.  Behaviour, 77, 222ff

External links

 Red-billed Gull, New Zealand Birds Online

red-billed gull
Endemic birds of New Zealand
red-billed gull
Taxa named by Johann Reinhold Forster
Subspecies